Francis Nugent (1569–1635 at Charleville, France) was an Irish priest of the Franciscan Capuchin Order. He was the founder of the Irish and the Rhenish Provinces of the Order.

Life 

Fr Lavalin Nugent (he took the name Francis on entering the Capuchins) was born in Walshestown near Mullingar, Co. Westmeath. He was the son of Edward Nugent, of the Dysert family, and Margaret O'Connor, the daughter of the 'Great O'Connor Offaly'. His aunt Katherine Nugent Cusack was the mother of Fr Christopher Cusack, founder of the Irish Colleges at Douai and Lille. At an early age, he was sent to France to receive an education which the Penal Laws denied him at home.

Before the age of twenty, he obtained the degree of doctor at the Universities of Paris and Louvain; and he occupied chairs in these two centres of learning, prior to his entrance into religion. He acquired a knowledge of Greek and Hebrew, and could speak a number of European languages fluently.

In 1589 he joined the Capuchin Flandro-Belgian Province, taking the name of Francis. In due course, he was professed and ordained priest. Towards the close of 1594, or the beginning of 1595 he was sent to France where the French Capuchin provinces were being formed and established communities at Metz and Charleville. Meanwhile, he continued to deliver lectures in philosophy and theology in Paris. In 1596 he went as custos-general of France to the general chapter at Rome, and was appointed commissary general of the Capuchins at Venice. Three years later, being again in Rome he took part in a public disputation in theology at which Pope Clement VIII presided. Father Francis maintained his thesis with skill and eloquence and was awarded the palm of victory.

At the general chapter of 1599, he was relieved of the provincialate and returned to Belgium, where he remained for about eleven years. In 1610, at the request of John Zwickhard, Archbishop of Mainz, seven friars of this province were sent to establish the order in the Rhine country, and Father Francis was appointed their commissary general. He founded a convent at Paderborn in 1612, and two years later communities were settled at Essen, Münster, and Aachen. He also established the Confraternity of the Passion at Cologne; amongst its first protectors were two friends, Mgr Antonio Albergatti, the nuncio at Cologne, and Frederick of Hohenzollern, the dean of the cathedral.

In 1615 he began a monastery at Mainz, and Pope Paul V nominated him vicar Apostolic and commissary general with full power to establish the Order in Ireland. Meanwhile, in 1618 the monastery of Charleville, in the Ardennes, became a training school for friars intended for the Irish mission, and facilities for the same purpose were offered by the Flandro-Belgian Province. A fresh band of workers was soon sent to Ireland and Father Nugent was thus enabled to found the first monastery in Dublin in 1624. The Archbishop of Dublin, Dr. Fleming, in 1629 addressed to the Irish clergy a letter commending the Capuchin Fathers specially mentioning "their learning, prudence, and earnestness". Two years later Father Nugent founded a monastery at Slane, in the diocese of his friend, Dr. Dease, who had previously borne public testimony to the merits of the Capuchins.

Owing to failing health, he retired in 1631 to Charleville. He is generally credited with the foundation at Lille of an Irish College with his cousin Fr. Christopher Cusack (President-general of the Irish Colleges in the low countries) for the free education of poor youths from Ulster and Meath for the Irish clergy. He died at Charleville on the Feast of the Ascension, 1635.

Giovanni Battista Rinuccini described him as "a man of most ardent zeal and most exemplary piety", and the annalists of the order state that he refused the Archbishopric of Armagh offered him by Pope Pius V, who styled him "the support of the Church and the light of the orthodox faith".

Works 

He wrote several works, of which the principal are:

"Tractatus De Hibernia"
"Cursus philosophicus et theologicus"
"De Meditatione et Conscientiæ examine"
"Paradisus contemplantium"
"Super regula Minorum, Expositio Copiosa".

References 

Attribution
 The entry cites:
F X Martin, Friar Nugent (London, 1962);
COGAN, The Diocese of Meath Ancient and Modern III (Dublin, 1870) 648;
Bullarium Ordinis F.F. Minorum. S.P. Francisci IV, V;
NICHOLAS, Bibliothèque de Troyes and Fran. Cap. Mon. (MS., 1643) (Dublin);
Franciscan Annals (1886), Nos. 111, 114, 116;
BELLESHEIM, Geschichte der Katholischen Kirche in Irland, II (Mainz, 1890), 362-63;
PELLEGRINO, Annali Capuccini, I (Milan, 1884), 155-160;
ROCCO DA CESINALE, Storia delle Missioni dei Capuccini, I (Paris, 1867), 375-380, 403 sq.

1569 births
1635 deaths
Capuchins
University of Paris alumni
People from County Westmeath
16th-century Irish Roman Catholic priests
17th-century Irish people
People of Elizabethan Ireland